Julia Alexandrovna Kourotchkina (born 10 August 1974 in Shcherbinka, Russia) is a Russian actress, model and former beauty queen who was crowned Miss Russia 1992 and was later crowned as Miss World 1992 in Sun City, South Africa making her the first Russian to be crowned as Miss World. She also served as one of the judges for Miss World 2005.

She has a daughter, Katya.

References

1974 births
Living people
Miss Russia winners
Miss World 1992 delegates
Miss World winners
Russian beauty pageant winners